Group Normal is a German Czech group of artists formed in 1979.

It consists of the artists Peter Angermann, Jan Knap and Milan Kunc, who met in the early 1970s at  Kunstakademie Düsseldorf in the classes of Joseph Beuys and Gerhard Richter.
They championed the rejection of individualism and, in line with this, created a large number of joint works – paintings that in some cases were done in public. The declared ambition of the three artists was to overcome  the predominating and elitist “academic avantgardism” by an art as demystified and accessible as possible.

Exhibitions 
 1980  11e Biennale de Paris, Musee d'Art Moderne
 1980  The Times Square Show, Colab, New York
 1980  Apres le Classicisme, Musee d'Art et de l'Industrie, St. Etienne
 1981 Rundschau Deutschland, Munich
 1981 Gruppe Normal, Neue Galerie / Sammlung Ludwig, Aachen
 1984 Von hier aus – Zwei Monate neue deutsche Kunst in Düsseldorf (From here – Two months of new German art in Düsseldorf)
 1984 Tiefe Blicke, Hessisches Landesmuseums, Darmstadt
 2005 "Prague Biennale 2, Prague
 2005 Normal Group,  MACI Museo Arte Contemporanea Isernia, Italy
 2007 Normal Group, Trevi Flash Art Museum, Palazzo Lucarni, Italy
 2015 The 80s. Figurative Painting in West Germany,  Städel Museum, Frankfurt am Main
 2016 Die Neuen Wilden, Groninger Museum
 2018 Libres Figurations au FHEL de Landereau

References

External links 
 Peter Angermann's website www.polka.de
 Homepage of Milan Kunc
 Jan Knap at Galerie Caesar

German artist groups and collectives